The Trellisane Confrontation is a science fiction novel by American writer David Dvorkin, part of the Star Trek: The Original Series franchise.

Plot
The planet Trellisane is the breeding ground for a three-way war. Captain Kirk ends up as a passenger on a Klingon warship. Dr. McCoy is stuck with cannibals. The USS Enterprise is surrounded by Romulans and the Neutral Zone is filled with more danger than ever.

External links

Novels based on Star Trek: The Original Series
1984 American novels
American science fiction novels